Gudeodiscus infralevis is a species of air-breathing land snail, a terrestrial pulmonate gastropod mollusk in the family Plectopylidae.

Distribution
The distribution of Gudeodiscus infralevis includes Vietnam.

The type locality is "Tonkin, Quang-Huyen".

Ecology
It is a ground-dwelling species as all other plectopylid snails in Vietnam.

References

External links

Plectopylidae
Gastropods described in 1908